Shaun Leo Leane (born 20 August 1963 in Oakleigh, Victoria) is a Labor Party politician and a current member for the Eastern Metropolitan Region in the Victorian Legislative Council, having been first elected in 2006.

Leane has served as a member of both the Drugs and Crime Prevention Committee and the Road Safety Committee since 2007. In December 2018, he was elected as the President of the Victorian Legislative Council. In June 2020, he was made Minister for Local Government, Minister for Suburban Development and Minister for Veterans. In June 2022, he was appointed as Minister for Commonwealth Games Legacy as well but relinquished his roles as local government and suburban development minister. In December 2022, after the 2022 state election, Leane was removed from the upcoming cabinet by the caucus. In compensation, Leane would be nominated as the President of the Legislative Council in the upcoming parliament. He was successfully appointed unopposed as President for the second time on 20 December 2022.

Leane is a member of the Australian Workers Union component of the Victorian Labor Right.

References

External links
 Parliamentary voting record of Shaun Leane at Victorian Parliament Tracker

1963 births
Living people
Members of the Victorian Legislative Council
Presidents of the Victorian Legislative Council
Australian Labor Party members of the Parliament of Victoria
21st-century Australian politicians
Labor Right politicians
People from Oakleigh, Victoria
Politicians from Melbourne